John Birdsall (October 5, 1840 – April 15, 1891) was an American merchant, Union Army officer, lawyer and politician from New York.

Life
He was born on October 5, 1840, in Flatbush, Kings County, New York. He attended the grammar school in Brooklyn, and then engaged in mercantile pursuits, and later in farming. He had a law office at 39 Nassau Street in New York City, and lived at Glen Cove.

During the American Civil War he became a major of the 13th New York Cavalry, and after the war was commissioned as a captain of cavalry in the U.S. Army.

He was a member of the New York State Senate (1st D.) in 1880 and 1881.

Apparently due to financial troubles, he committed suicide April 15, 1891, by inhaling natural gas, lying fully dressed on the bed in a room at the United States Hotel, on the corner of Pearl and Fulton streets, in Manhattan.

Sources

1840 births
1891 deaths
Republican Party New York (state) state senators
People from Flatbush, Brooklyn
American politicians who committed suicide
Suicides in New York City
Suicides by gas
Union Army officers
19th-century American politicians